Marguerite Borel known as Camille Marbo (11 April 1883 – 5 February 1969) née Marguerite Appell, was a 20th-century French writer, president and laureate of the Prix Femina in 1913 and president of the Société des gens de lettres.

Biography 
Daughter of mathematician, Paul Appell (1855–1930), Camille Marbo was given the name Marguerite Appell.

In 1901, she married the mathematician and politician Émile Borel (1871–1956).

In 1906, she created  La Revue du mois, a scientific and literary journal, with her husband. The publication allowed contributors the opportunity to choose and discuss subjects as they pleased. Marguerite Borel personally took charge of the critiques of plays, novels, and various chronicles.

When she began writing novels, she chose the pseudonym Camille Marbo, the name Marbo taking the first three letters of her first name Marguerite and the first two of her last name Borel.

In 1913, Camille Marbo was awarded the Prix Femina, then called Prix de la Vie heureuse, for her first novel La statue voilée.

During the First World War, she set the Comité de secours national, the national relief committee with her father. She also founded and ran a temporary hospital in Paris, which earned her the Medal of French Gratitude. In 1916, she was asked to participate in the organization of women in the workforce in place of the men who had gone to battle. Benefiting from her experience as head of the hospital, she created a recruitment center for women, which auditioned, tested, and employed both salaried employees and volunteers in the services sector. More than 20,000 women were employed through this program. The treatise she published in 1919, "Mobilization féminine en France", documents the contribution of these women to the Allied victory. This document is notable for its unique content as well as its methodical and professional form. It is carefully contextualized and enriched with statistics.

She wrote about forty other novels, some monographs and memoirs.

A friend of Marie Curie, she welcomed Marie and her daughters into her home and gave them shelter during the "affaire Langevin", a revelation made by the press of an extramarital affair between Marie Curie, a widow at the time, and Paul Langevin.

Marguerite Borel took part in the political life of Saint-Affrique and participated in the electoral campaigns of her husband, Émile Borel. Marguerite herself was deputy mayor of Saint-Affrique from 1947 to 1954.

In February 1928, Camille Marbo succeeded Jean Dornis as president of the Denier des veuves de la SGDL, giving assistance to the widows of writers without resources.

She became president of the Société des gens de lettres in 1937 and was re-elected in 1938 and again after the liberation in 1947. She was also a member of the jury of the Prix Femina and later became its president.

She published her memoirs in 1967 under the title  À travers deux siècles, souvenirs et rencontres (1883-1967).

Marguerite died in 1969, she was a Commander of the Legion Of Honour.

Works 

1906: Christine Rodis
1913: La Statue voilée, (Prix Femina in 1913) 
1918: Le Survivant
1924: Les Cahiers de Francine
1925: À l'enseigne du Griffon
1926: Hélène Barraux (celle qui défiait l'amour) 
1931: À bord de la "Croix du Sud"
1932: Celle qui défiait l'amour
1933: Ruth
1934: Le Perroquet bleu
1936: Flammes juives
1938: Les Millions de l'émir
1941: Le Créole au cœur ardent
1941: Violette et son cœur
1943: La Baie des courlis
1944: L'Oiseau captif
1945: Le Buisson de lilas
1945: La Nièce du boucanier 
1946: La Maison Bartholène 
1947: L'Enigme du manoir
1947: Tante Estelle 
1948: L'Idole offensée
1949: Sous les eucalyptus
1949: Le Chateau condamné
1950: La Tour carrée
1951: La Reine de Golconde
1952: Monsieur Charles
1953: Douce marraine
1953: Jeux de la science et de l'amour
1955: Isabelle et le secret
1955: Le Visiteur inconnu 
1956: L'Amie de pension
1957: Le Bel héritage
1958: Mademoiselle Anaïs
1959: La Dame de Maison-Blanche
1959: Les Lettres
1960: Le Diamant bleu
1961: La Dernière nuit
1961: Un Étrange garçon
1962: Le Fiancé mystérieux
1963: La Protectrice
1964: Les Amoureux du Castillou
1965: L'Énigmatique Sylvio
1965: Le Sel de ma vie
1966: Mon amour, d'où viens-tu ?
1967: À travers deux siècles, souvenirs et rencontres (1883–1967), Paris, Grasset
1967: Clara Fontaine

Distinctions 
 Commander of the Legion Of Honour.
 Prix Femina, then called Prix de la Vie heureuse, 1913.
 Medal of French Gratitude.

See also 
 Émile Borel
 Prix Femina 
 Société des gens de lettres

References

Bibliography  
 "Camille Marbo", in Nouveau Dictionnaire national des contemporains, Paris, 1962, vol. 1, p. 579.
 
 Mémoires : À travers deux siècles, souvenirs et rencontres (1883–1967), Paris, Éditions Grasset, 1967.

External links 
 Camille Marbo on the site of the Académie française
 Biographie
 Notice on Tombes et sépultures
 Jeux de la science et de l'amour première partie on Revue des Deux Mondes

20th-century French non-fiction writers
20th-century French women writers
Prix Femina winners
French salon-holders
Commandeurs of the Légion d'honneur
1883 births
1969 deaths